Georges Guibert (1915 – 1997) was a French Roman Catholic  missionary in Senegal and Réunion. He was consecrated a bishop by Archbishop Marcel Lefebvre.

1915 births
1997 deaths
French Roman Catholic missionaries
Clergy from Paris
Roman Catholic missionaries in Réunion
Roman Catholic missionaries in Senegal
French expatriates in Senegal